FMCS may refer to:
 Framwellgate School Durham, formerly known as the Framwellgate Moor Comprehensive School
 Federal Mediation and Conciliation Service (Canada)
 Federal Mediation and Conciliation Service (United States)
 Formula Masters China
 Fourze Module Change Series, a toy line of Astroswitch Modules used in Kamen Rider Fourze
 Foreign Military Construction Sales

See also 
 FMC (disambiguation)